Ulvibacter marinus is a Gram-negative, aerobic, chemoheterotrophic and non-motile bacterium from the genus of Ulvibacter which has been isolated from seawater from the coast of the Yellow Sea.

References

Flavobacteria
Bacteria described in 2014